Defending champion Chris Evert defeated Evonne Goolagong in a rematch of the previous year's final, 6–3, 6–0 to win the women's singles tennis title at the 1976 US Open. It was her second US Open title and her sixth major singles title overall. It was Goolagong's fourth consecutive runner-up finish at the event.

Seeds
The seeded players are listed below. Chris Evert is the champion; others show the round in which they were eliminated.

  Chris Evert (champion)
  Evonne Goolagong (finalist)
  Martina Navratilova (first round)
  Virginia Wade (second round)
  Nancy Richey (second round)
  Rosie Casals (quarterfinalist)
  Kerry Reid (second round)
  Olga Morozova (third round)
  Sue Barker (fourth round)
  Dianne Fromholtz (semifinalist)
  Mona Guerrant (first round)
  Françoise Dürr (fourth round)
  Natasha Chmyreva (quarterfinalist)
  Carrie Meyer (first round)
  Terry Holladay (fourth round)
  Betty Stöve (first round)

Draw

Key
 Q = Qualifier
 WC = Wild card
 LL = Lucky loser
 r = Retired

Finals

Earlier rounds

Section 1

Section 2

Section 3

Section 4

Section 5

Section 6

Section 7

Section 8

External links
1976 US Open – Women's draws and results at the International Tennis Federation

Women's Singles
US Open (tennis) by year – Women's singles
1976 in women's tennis
1976 in American women's sports